Altitoxin is a neurotoxin found in the South African scorpion Parabuthus transvaalicus. Injection of altitoxin in mice leads to akinesia, depression and death.

Sources

Altitoxin is secreted by the venom gland of the South African spitting (or fattail) scorpion Parabuthus transvaalicus.

Chemistry
Altitoxin, with the amino acid sequence ADVPGNYPLDKDGNTYTCLELGENKDCQKVCKLHGVQYGYCYAFFCWCKELDDKDVSV, is 58 amino acid residues long and has a molecular mass of 6598 Da; it has 3 disulfide bridges (Cys18-Cys41, Cys27-Cys46, and Cys31-Cys48). It has large homology to other toxins from the venom of Parabuthus transvaalicus, including bestoxin, birtoxin, ikitoxin and dortoxin.

Target
Altitoxin has sequence homology to scorpion β-toxins, suggesting it might target sodium channels. However, its depressing action following injection into mice  is not in agreement with the effect of β-toxins on sodium channels. Related scorpion toxins, which include birtoxin and bestoxin, exhibit highly divergent biological activity, indicating that the mode of action of these toxins is highly diverse.

Toxicity
An injection of 100 ng altitoxin in 20 g mouse (ED99) causes a state of akinesia and depression. Lethality is reached at injecting 200 ng.

References

Neurotoxins
Ion channel toxins